The Electronic Visualisation and the Arts conferences (EVA Conferences for short, aka Electronic Information, the Visual Arts and Beyond) are a series of international interdisciplinary conferences mainly in Europe, but also elsewhere in the world, for people interested in the application of information technology to the cultural and especially the visual arts field, including art galleries and museums.

Overview
Started in London (United Kingdom), there are now EVA conferences in Berlin (Germany), Florence (Italy), Jerusalem (Israel), Paris (France), St Petersburg (formerly in Moscow, Russia), Australasia (first time in Canberra, Australia, in 2016) and other major cities. The first EVA Conference was held at Imperial College, London in 1990, organised by the founders James Hemsley, Kirk Martinez, and Anthony Hamber.

The conferences have been overseen by EVA Conferences International, based in London. Conference proceedings are published. In addition, two collected volumes of revised papers are available.

EVA London
The EVA London conference, founded in 1990 by James Hemsley, is now organised through the Computer Arts Society (CAS), a Specialist Group of the BCS each July at the BCS London office.

Some V&A Digital Futures events organised by the Victoria and Albert Museum have been held in conjunction with EVA London. In 2016, it hosted an event for the Lumen Prize, an annual award for digital art. The proceedings have published through the BCS Electronic Workshops in Computing (eWiC) series since 2008 and are indexed by DBLP.

In 2019, EVA London helped to co-organise the Event Two digital art exhibition at the Royal College of Art (RCA), held immediately after the conference, celebrating the 50th anniversary of the Event One exhibition, also held at the RCA. The main chairs are Jonathan Bowen, Graham Diprose, Nick Lambert, and Jon Weinel.

See also
 Computer Arts Society
 ICHIM
 Lumen Prize
 Museums and the Web
 V&A Digital Futures

References

External links

 EVA Conferences International website
 EVA London website
 EVA London archive via Archive.org
 EVA Berlin online in open access at the Heidelberg University Library

1990 establishments in England
Recurring events established in 1990
International conferences
Museum events
Visualization (research)
Information technology organizations based in Europe
Visual arts conferences
Digital art
July events
Arts in London
Museum informatics